Boswall is a surname. Notable people with the name include:

Alexander Henry Boswall MacGowan (1850–1927), British businessman and political figure
John Boswall ( 1920–2011), British actor
Jeffery Boswall (1931–2012), British naturalist, broadcaster and educator
Karen Boswall, British independent film maker
Thomas Boswall Beach (1866–1941), British Army officer during the South African War and First World War

See also 
Houstoun-Boswall baronets, is a title in the Baronetage of the United Kingdom